United Nations Security Council Resolution 1729, adopted unanimously on December 15, 2006, after considering a report by the Secretary-General Kofi Annan regarding the United Nations Disengagement Observer Force (UNDOF), the Council extended its mandate for a further six months until June 30, 2007.

Details
The resolution called upon the parties concerned to immediately implement Resolution 338 (1973) and requested that the Secretary-General submit a report on the situation at the end of that period.

The Secretary-General's report pursuant to the previous resolution on UNDOF said that the situation between Israel and Syria had remained generally quiet, though the situation in the Middle East as a whole continued to remain tense until a settlement addressing all aspects of the problem could be reached.

The Council also welcomed efforts by UNDOF to implement the zero-tolerance sexual exploitation policy.

See also
 Arab–Israeli conflict
 Golan Heights
 Israel–Syria relations
 List of United Nations Security Council Resolutions 1701 to 1800 (2006–2008)
 2000–2006 Shebaa Farms conflict

References

External links
 
Text of the Resolution at undocs.org

 1729
 1729
 1729
2006 in Israel
2006 in Syria
December 2006 events